The Upsilon Sigma Phi is the oldest Greek-letter organization and fraternity in Asia. Founded in 1918, it is also the oldest student organization in continuous existence in the University of the Philippines. It has two chapters—a single chapter for the UP Diliman and UP Manila campuses, and another for UP Los Baños. Membership remains exclusive to UP students, and is by invitation only.

Among its alumni are two Philippine presidents, a vice president, fifteen senators, fourteen supreme court justices (including three chief justices), three house speakers, a chairman of the United Nations Commission on Human Rights, three executive secretaries, four solicitors-general, twenty-six ambassadors, an AFP chief of staff, a NEDA director-general, a Central Bank governor, twenty-four honorees of The Outstanding Young Men, four national scientists, three national artists, a recipient of the Ramon Magsaysay Award, and five UP presidents.

History

Early years 
The Upsilon Sigma Phi was founded in 1918 by twelve students and two professors from the University of the Philippines Manila.

It was formally organized on November 19, 1920 in a meeting held at the Metropolitan Restaurant in Intramuros, Manila where the fraternity elected its first officers (among which include Agapito Jose del Rosario y Abad Santos, one of the founders of the Socialist Party of the Philippines and later on Mayor of Angeles, Pampanga).

Four months later, on March 24, 1921, the Greek letters "ΥΣΦ", standing for the initials of the name "University Students Fraternity" were formally adopted. The fraternity also adopted its themes, rites, and motto "We Gather Light to Scatter".  

During its early years, invitations for membership were given out only to individuals who served in leadership positions, or individuals which the fraternity deemed in possession of leadership potential or regarded as excellent in their respective fields.

From 1930 to 1949, thirteen of its members chaired the UP Student Council (including Jose Laurel Jr., and Sotero Laurel, sons of Jose P. Laurel, himself an Upsilonian). Its members were prominent contributors in campus publications, a number of whom served as editors-in-chief of the Philippine Collegian (such as Arturo Tolentino and Armando Malay) and the now defunct annual publication, The Philippinensian.

During this time, then UP Student Council President Wenceslao Vinzons, together with members of the fraternity, led demonstrations before the Philippine Congress to protest the insertion of a provision in the appropriations act that gave lawmakers a salary increase.
The UP administration relocated to the Diliman campus In the aftermath of the Battle of Manila. Prominent landmarks in the Diliman campus such as Palma Hall, Melchor Hall, Quezon Hall, and the Church of the Risen Lord were designed and constructed by university architect and Upsilonian Cesar Concio. Through the efforts of the UP Alumni Association headed by Upsilonian Hermenegildo Reyes, the fraternity helped raise funds for the construction of the bell tower called the "Carillon" which still stands today as another prominent landmark. Meanwhile, a chapter in UP Los Baños was established; the first Greek-letter organization in the campus.

During the same period, the fraternity hosted the Cavalcades, a series of stage plays and musicals that began on campus and eventually toured nationwide. Profits from "Aloyan" (the first full-length English play written by a Filipino) and "Hanako" plays were used to help finance the construction and furnishing of the Church of the Holy Sacrifice. One of the fraternity's productions, Linda, cast the then 17-year-old Pilita Corrales.

Recent years 

In 2013, the fraternity was named as a finalist in the Ten Accomplished Youth Organizations (TAYO) Awards, the country’s premier institution that recognizes and supports the outstanding contributions of youth organizations to the country.On July 25, 2018, the Malacañang Palace issued Proclamation Order No. 539 recognizing the fraternity for its "significant contributions to numerous civic and humanitarian causes, as well as the dedication and commitment of its members to public service and nation-building." The year 2018 was also declared as the "Year for the Celebration of the Centennial Anniversary of the Upsilon Sigma Phi."

In the same year, the fraternity inaugurated the UP Promenade, a 120-meter walkway equipped with internet and Wi-Fi capable facilities available for public use. In the Los Baños campus, the fraternity also unveiled another flagship centennial project, The Kapit-Kapit Monument, which depicts 14 individuals with their arms locked in solidarity.

Membership 

Members of the Upsilon Sigma Phi are called Fellows or Upsilonians.

Membership is by invitation only and is exclusive to male individuals in the University of the Philippines Diliman, Manila and Los Baños campuses. Selection is based on an individual's leadership positions and potential success and prominence in their respective fields (both on- and off-campus). Owing to its rigorous screening of invitees, its alumni roster consists of a diverse roll of successful members in public service, industry, medicine, military, and academia among others.

In public service alone, the fraternity has produced two Philippine presidents, an acting president, a vice president, 15 senators (including three senate presidents), 14 Supreme Court justices (including three chief justices), three house speakers, 37 representatives, 20 members of the Batasang Pambansa, 19 governors, three executive secretaries, four solicitors-general, 26 ambassadors, five commissioners in the Constitutional Commission of 1986, and five UP presidents, among the numerous more that have led executive departments and agencies, judicial incumbencies, local government units, and other constitutional offices.

Beyond public service, its roster includes a Ramon Magsaysay Awardee, four national scientists, a national artist, 24 honorees of The Outstanding Young Men, and other prominent figures in business, research, and medicine.

Notable people known to be Upsilon Sigma Phi fellows include:

Jorge Araneta – billionaire businessman; Chairman, Araneta Group of Companies; director, 7-Eleven Philippines
Joker Arroyo – Senator; Executive Secretary; Makati Representative; founder of Free Legal Assistance Group (FLAG)
Ninoy Aquino – Senator; Tarlac Governor; Korean War correspondent; founder, Lakas ng Bayan (now PDP–Laban); recipient, Quezon Service Cross
Danilo Concepcion – former President, University of the Philippines; Dean, UP College of Law; Representative, Interim Batasang Pambansa
Jose Encarnacion Jr. – National Scientist for Economics; Dean, UP School of Economics
Dick Gordon – Senator; Chairman, Philippine Red Cross; founding Chairman, Subic Bay Metropolitan Authority; delegate, 1970 Constitutional Convention
Teodoro Kalaw – Father of the Philippine Library System; Batangas Representative; Interior Secretary
Doy Laurel – 8th Philippine Vice President; 5th Prime Minister; Senator; founder, United Nationalist Democratic Organization (UNIDO)
José Laurel Jr. – 9th Speaker of the House of Representatives; Batangas Representative
José P. Laurel – 3rd Philippine President; Senator; Justice of the Supreme Court 
Ferdinand Marcos – 10th Philippine President; 3rd Prime Minister; 11th Senate President, Ilocos Norte Representative, World War II veteran, bar topnotcher
Querube Makalintal – 11th Chief Justice of the Supreme Court; 14th Speaker of the House of Representatives; Solicitor General
Mel Mathay –  longtime Quezon City Mayor; Quezon City Representative; Chairman, Metropolitan Manila Authority (now MMDA)
Christian Monsod –  Chairman, COMELEC; founder, Legal Network for Truthful Elections (LENTE); member, Constitutional Commission of 1986
Alfredo Pascual – current Secretary of Trade and Industry; President, University of the Philippines
Kiko Pangilinan – Senator; President, Liberal Party; alumnus, John F. Kennedy School of Government, Harvard University
Gil Puyat – 13th Senate President; founder, Manila Banking Corporation (now China Bank Savings); Knight of the Pontifical Equestrian Order of St. Gregory the Great
Antonio Quirino – founder of the first television station in the Philippines, Alto Broadcasting System (now part of ABS-CBN)
Martin Romualdez – current Speaker, House of Representatives; House Majority Leader, Leyte Representative; National President, Lakas–CMD
Roman Romulo – Pasig Representative; lawyer; Chairperson, House Committee on Higher and Technical Education; principal author, Iskolar ng Bayan Act of 2014
Gerry Roxas – Senate Minority Leader; Capiz Representative; lawyer; founder, Gerry Roxas Foundation
José Abad Santos – Acting Philippine President; 5th Chief Justice of the Supreme Court; Secretary of Justice
Arturo Tolentino – 12th Senate President; head of the Philippine delegation, UN Convention on the Law of the Sea (UNCLOS)
Wenceslao Vinzons – World War II hero; Camarines Norte Governor; "Father of Student Activism in the Philippines"; member, 1934 Constitutional Convention
Nicanor Yñiguez – 15th Speaker of the House of Representatives; Southern Leyte Representative

Controversies 
On July 18, 1954, UP student Gonzalo Mariano Albert died after undergoing part of the initiation process for Upsilon Sigma Phi. After complaining of stomach pain, the student was rushed to a hospital where he was diagnosed and underwent emergency appendectomy when he died on the operating table. Philippine President Ramon Magsaysay formed an investigation committee which concluded that while medico-legal findings failed to show that the hazing "contributed to Albert's death", the initiation ritual severely weakened his physical condition prior to the appendectomy. The committee further recommended the expulsion of four Upsilon officers, the suspension of dozens of its members and neophytes, and a censure of several UP deans, directors, and faculty members for their failure to discharge their duties. Albert's death was the first recorded death attributed to hazing in the Philippines, and the only known death of an Upsilon Sigma Phi neophyte.

On September 20, 1969, a member of Upsilon Sigma Phiwas beaten to death by members of the Beta Sigma fraternity. He was the first recorded fatality in a fraternity "rumble" in the University of the Philippines, prompting UP president Salvador P. Lopez to issue new rules and regulations regarding student misconduct as well as issuing a suspension for both Upsilon Sigma Phi and Beta Sigma.

On July 4, 2014, UP Diliman chancellor Michael Tan identified Upsilon Sigma Phi as the fraternity involved in the hazing of a 17-year-old student who sustained multiple injuries that required hospitalization.

On June 18, 2015, Quezon City police arrested five members of Upsilon Sigma Phi after allegedly mauling three rival fraternity members and attempting to escape in a brief car chase. The five members were released on June 24, 2015 after posting bail of  each for frustrated murder charges, and  each for illegal possession of ammunition.

On November 14, 2018, Upsilon Sigma Phi and Alpha Phi Beta were involved in a brawl caught on campus CCTV. The incident prompted campus authorities to tighten security within the UP system and a statement of condemnation from Diliman chancellor Tan and UP president Concepcion. The same month, a Messenger group chat allegedly belonging to members of Upsilon Sigma Phi was leaked online. The group chat contained exchanges that were widely condemned as "reprehensible and totally unacceptable".

References 

 
Fraternities and sororities in the Philippines
Student societies in the Philippines
University of the Philippines
Student organizations established in 1918
1918 establishments in the Philippines